Nirab-e Olya (also Romanized as Nīrāb-e ‘Olyā) is a village in Soleyman Rural District, Soleyman District, Zaveh County, Razavi Khorasan Province, Iran. At the 2006 census, its population was 225, in 43 families.

References 

Populated places in Zaveh County